United States v. Craft, 535 U.S. 274 (2002) is a United States Supreme Court ruling that held a tenant possesses an individual right in their own estate to the level to constitute "rights to property" for the purpose of a lien.

References 

United States Supreme Court cases
United States Supreme Court cases of the Rehnquist Court